A rapporteur is a person who is appointed by an organization to report on the proceedings of its meetings. The term is a French-derived word.

For example, Dick Marty was appointed rapporteur by the Parliamentary Assembly of the Council of Europe to investigate extraordinary rendition by the CIA.

Rapporteur of the European Parliament
The rapporteur is an eminent role in the legislative process of the European Parliament (EP). They are a Member of the European Parliament (MEP) responsible for handling a legislative proposal – both procedurally and with regard to its substance – on behalf of the European Commission, the Council of the European Union or the EP. Based on the relevant proposal, the rapporteur is appointed by the relevant Committees of the European Parliament charged with drawing up a legislative recommendation for the EP to vote on. The rapporteur, therefore, has a substantial influence in the process leading to the adoption of EU-legislation.

Their key functions are:
 Analyze the proposal and, based on this, draft an EP Own-initiative Report
 Lead discussion within the relevant Committee
 Consult with third party specialists and parties affected
 Recommend the political line to be followed
 Present the report to the EP Plenary
 Lead negotiations with European Commission or Council of the European Union, where needed.

Shadow rapporteur of the European Parliament
Political groups within the committee in charge of drafting a legislative recommendation may appoint a shadow rapporteur to represent their views.

See also
Special rapporteur
United Nations special rapporteur
Judge-Rapporteur
Rapporteur Judge

References

Region-specific legal occupations

(References:)
Oxford Online Dictionary